HoloBuilder Inc., founded in 2016 by Mostafa Akbari-Hochberg, Simon Heinen, and Kristina Tenhaft with the goal to assist builders and engineers to create immersive progress views of construction sites.

The company is a German–American construction-technology startup, developed in both San Francisco, California, and Aachen, Germany. They offer tools to create and share 360° views of construction sites and buildings. These digitized sites help organizations in managing their real-world counterparts effortlessly. As of 2016, HoloBuilder has been used in over 190 countries around the world, with more than 15,000 projects created and 800,000 viewers.

The cloud-based software provides virtual reality capturing of construction sites. HoloBuilder for constructions focuses on the whole development process, from the planning phase up until maintenance management.

Products

HoloBuilder
Holobuilder.com is an online virtual reality capturing software. This means that users can easily and quickly create virtual tours using 360° photos through your construction site.
When reliable and affordable 360° cameras hit the market, it became easier than ever to capture surroundings with the tap of a button.

HoloBuilder projects support multiple sheets, making it easy to manage big construction sites with multiple floors in one web-based project, which is accessible remotely, coupled with the time-travel feature, another functionality that makes it easy to track the progress over time on a construction site.

Users include construction companies, realtors. architects, designers and Industry 4.0 companies who use it to create Virtual Tours of real estate properties, construction sites or digital Augmented Reality user manuals.

These projects can be created and viewed in the browser and are embeddable into any website as an iFrame. HoloBuilder leverages HTML5 and WebGL to be usable in browsers without the need of plugins such as Adobe Flash, and in mobile browsers.  It uses the device sensors to support browser-based VR in Google Cardboard and similar VR headsets.

Users can import their 360 pictures taken with cameras like the Ricoh Theta S and combine them with 3D models from editors like AutoCAD, SketchUp or Blender.

JobWalk app

The JobWalk App enables users to create virtual 360° tours on the go. The user connects a 360° Camera with his mobile device via Wi-Fi. After taking 360° images and linking the scenes, the 360° tour can be synchronized with the web-platform.

Product details

Supported imports
 360° images captured by 360° cameras
 Revit renderings
 Navisworks

Features
 Collaboration in real-time: allows to invite an unlimited number of collaborators
 TimeTravel: time travel allows to capture progress over time by adding multiple 360° pictures to the same location point on a sheet
 Multiple sheets: Allows to add more than just one sheet, e.g. floorplans, to a single HoloBuilder project
 Add 3D objects
 Add 2D objects
 Face blurring
 Import HoloBuilder projects into a new one
 Share projects
 Embedding HoloBuilder projects as iframe

Other
 Constructech Commercial Top Products 2017
 Gartner Cool Vendor 2016
 Ricoh Theta Grand Prize 2015

References

External links
 Holobuilder official website
 Tutorials for usage of holobuilder.com functionalities

Computer-aided design software
Technology companies of the United States
Virtual reality
Web applications